The following is a timeline of the history of the city of Hanover, Germany.

Prior to 19th century

 1333 - Kreuzkirche (church) consecrated.
 1347 - Aegidienkirche (church) built.
 1366 - Marktkirche (church) built.
 1369 - Welfs in power.
 1382 -  built near city.
 1400 - Public clock installed (approximate date).
 1410 - Town Hall building expanded (approximate date).(de)
 1440 -  (library) founded.
 1529 - Hanover Schützenfest established.
 1550 -  (cemetery) established.
 1670 - Neustädter Kirche (church) built.
 1676 - Herrenhausen Palace expansion begins.
 1689
 Population: 11,373.
  opens with premiere of Steffani's opera Henrico Leone.
 1698 -  in use.
 1720 -  active.
 1726 -  laid out.
 1755 - Population: 17,432.
 1797 -  founded.
 1798 -  (city directory) begins publication.

19th century
 1810 - Hanover becomes part of the Kingdom of Westphalia.
 1815 - City becomes capital of the Kingdom of Hanover.
 1821 - Population: 33,255.
 1824 -  becomes part of city.
 1826 - Gas lighting installed.
 1832 -  (art society) formed.
 1835 -  (historical society) founded.
 1838 -  (military barracks) built.
 1844 - Hanover–Braunschweig Railway in operation.
 1847
 Bremen–Hanover railway begins operating.
 Development of  area begins.
 1851 - Thalia Society founded.
 1852
 Royal Theatre built.
  newspaper in publication.
 1853 - Hanoverian Southern Railway begins operating.
 1854 -  newspaper begins publication.
 1856 -  built.
 1861 - Population: 71,170.
 1864
 Hanover–Hamburg railway in operation.
 1865 - Hanover Zoo established.
 1866
 Hanover becomes part of Prussia.
  active.
  (palace) built.
 X Army Corps headquartered in Hanover.
  established.
 1870 -  built.
 1871 - Continental rubber manufacturer in business.
 1872
 Horse-drawn tram begins operating.(de)
  built.
 1879 - Hannover Hauptbahnhof rebuilt.
 1885 - Population: 139,731.
 1886 -  built.
 1888 - Photographischer Verein founded.
 1889
  opens.
 Kestner Museum established.
 1891 - , Herrenhausen, and  become part of city.
 1893
 Electric tram begins operating.(de)
  newspaper begins publication.
 1895 -  and  built.
 1896
 Hannover 96 football club formed.
  installed.
 1897 - Music Conservatory established.
 1898 - Hannoversche Waggonfabrik (manufacturer) in business.

20th century

1900-1945
 1902 - Provincial museum built.
 1903 -  opens.
 1904 - Bismarck Tower erected.
 1908 - Anti-noise society formed.
 1911 -  (theatre) opens.
 1914
 Stadthalle built.(de)
  opens.
 1916
 Kestnergesellschaft (modern art society) formed.
  (fountain) installed in the Neustädter Markt.
 1918
 November: German Revolution of 1918–19.
  becomes mayor.
 1919
 Deutsche Luft-Reederei begins operating its Berlin-Hannover airplane route.
 Population: 310,431.
 1920
 Linden becomes part of city.
  established.
 1921
 Nazi Party branch established.
 Überlandwerke und Straßenbahnen Hannover AG (public transit entity) active.
  in use.
 1923
 German Völkisch Freedom Party branch established.
 Nazi  weekly newspaper begins publication.
 1924 -  becomes mayor.
 1925
 Arthur Menge becomes mayor.
 Population: 422,745.
 1927 - Botanischer Schulgarten Burg (garden) established.
 1936 - Maschsee (lake) created.
 1937 -  becomes mayor.
 1938 - November: Kristallnacht pogrom against Jews.
 1939
 September: Bombing of Hanover in World War II by Allied forces begins.
 Population: 472,527.
 1942 -  becomes Staatskommissare.(de)
 1944
 August:  begins operating.
 September:  begins operating.
 November:  established.
  becomes Staatskommissare.(de)
 1945
 February:  begins operating.
 10 April: Allied forces arrive.
 April–May: Mayor, Regierungspräsident, and Oberpräsident (local government officials) appointed.

1946-1990s
 1946 - February: Flood.(de)
 1947
 1 April: Food protest.
 Hannover Messe (trade fair) begins.
 1949
 Hannoversche Allgemeine Zeitung (newspaper) in publication.
  built.
 1950s - Hannover War Cemetery established.
 1951 -  built.
 1952
  (theatre) established.
  built.
 1954
 Niedersachsenstadion (stadium) opens.
 Mannesmann Tower erected.
  begins.
  rebuilt.
 1965 -  begins.
 1965 - Population: 555,228.
 1969 -  built.
 1970 - Norddeutsche Landesbank headquartered in city.
 1972 -  becomes mayor.
 1974 - Ahelm, Anderten, Bemerode, Misburg, Vinnhorst, Wettbergen, and  become part of city.
 1975
 Hanover Stadtbahn begins operating.
 1979 - Sprengel Museum opens.
 1987 -  founded.
 1991 - Hanover–Würzburg high-speed railway built.
 2000
 June: Expo 2000 opens.
 Hanover S-Bahn commuter rail begins operating.

21st century

 2001 - Gehry Tower built.
 2002 -  built.
 2005 - Regional  established, including its .
 2006 - Stephan Weil becomes mayor.
 2008
  urban planning process begins.
 Baitus Sami Mosque built.
 2013 - Stefan Schostok becomes mayor.
 2014 - Population: 523,642.

Images

See also
 Hanover history
 
 History of Hanover (region)
 History of the Jews in Hannover
 List of mayors of Hanover
 
 

Other cities in the state of Lower Saxony:(de)
 Timeline of Braunschweig

References

This article incorporates information from the German Wikipedia.

Bibliography

in English
 
 
 
 
  + 1873 ed.

in German
published in the 19th century
 
 
  + 1884 ed.
  ongoing
 
 

published in the 20th century
  (chronology)
 
 
 
 
  (chronology)
 
 

published in the 21st century
 
 
 (de)

External links

 

 
Hanover